Clathrosepta depressa is a species of sea snail, a marine gastropod mollusk in the family Fissurellidae, the keyhole limpets.

Description
The size of the shell reaches 13 mm.

Distribution
This species occurs on the East Pacific Rise, a mid-ocean ridge

References

  McLean J.H. & Geiger D.L. 1998. New genera and species having the Fissurisepta shell form, with a generic level phylogenetic analysis (Gastropoda: Fissurellidae). Contributions in Science, Natural History Museum of Los Angeles County, 475: 1–32

External links
 

Fissurellidae
Gastropods described in 1998